The 1970–71 Boston Bruins season was the Bruins' 47th season in the NHL.

Offseason
Bobby Orr signed the NHL's first one million dollar contract (to be paid out over five years).

NHL Draft

Regular season
The 1970–71 Bruins set an NHL record by having 10 different skaters score 20 goals or more in a season. The record was broken by the 1977–78 Bruins when they had 11 different skaters with 20 goals or more.

Playoffs
The postseason ended quickly for the Bruins as they lost in the opening round to the Montreal Canadiens and their rookie goaltender Ken Dryden in a seven-game upset.

Season standings

Schedule and results

Playoffs

Quarterfinals: (E1) Boston Bruins vs. (E3) Montreal Canadiens

Player statistics

Regular season
Scoring

Goaltending

Playoffs
Scoring

Goaltending

Awards and records
 Prince of Wales Trophy: || Boston Bruins
 Art Ross Trophy: || Phil Esposito
 Hart Memorial Trophy: || Bobby Orr
 James Norris Memorial Trophy: || Bobby Orr
 Lady Byng Memorial Trophy: || Johnny Bucyk
 Lester B. Pearson Award: || Phil Esposito
 NHL Plus/Minus Award: || Bobby Orr
 Johnny Bucyk, Left Wing, NHL First Team All-Star
 Phil Esposito, Center, NHL First Team All-Star
 Phil Esposito, Club Record, Most Points in a Season, 152
 Phil Esposito, NHL Record, Most Shots on Goal in One Season (550)
 Ken Hodge, Right Wing, NHL First Team All-Star
 Bobby Orr, Defence, NHL First Team All-Star
 Bobby Orr, Club Record, Most Assists in a Season, 102
 Bobby Orr, NHL Record, Most Assists by a Defenseman in One Season (102)
 Bobby Orr, NHL Record, Most Points by a Defenseman in One Season (139)

References
 Bruins on Hockey Database

Boston Bruins seasons
Boston Bruins
Boston Bruins
Boston Bruins
Boston Bruins
Bruins
Bruins